Golconda is a rural locality in the local government areas of Launceston and Dorset, in the Launceston and North-east regions of Tasmania. The 2016 census determined a population of 26 for the state suburb of Golconda.

History
The locality has the name of an ancient and now ruined city in India. It was gazetted as a locality in 1956.

Geography
The Denison River passes through from west to north-east.

Road infrastructure
Route B81 route (Golconda Road) passes through from west to east. The C826 route (Ferny Hills Road) starts at an intersection with B81 in the centre and exits to the north.

References

Localities of City of Launceston
Localities of Dorset Council (Australia)
Towns in Tasmania